Nematoida is a grouping of animals, including the roundworms and horsehair worms.

References 

 
Protostome unranked clades